Sorliney is a village (selo) in Chamzinsky District of the Republic of Mordovia, Russia.

References

Rural localities in Mordovia
Chamzinsky District